10 Upper Bank Street is a 32-story commercial skyscraper located in Canary Wharf, in the Docklands area of London.

It was designed by the architect Kohn Pedersen Fox and built by Canary Wharf Contractors.

Most of the building is occupied by the law firm Clifford Chance, and serves as its world headquarters.

Tenants
 Clifford Chance
FTSE
 Mastercard UK
TotalEnergies
 Infosys
Deutsche Bank
 Loan Market Association
 Van Dyk

See also
 Tall buildings in London

References

External links
http://www.10upperbankstreet.com
From emporis.com

Canary Wharf buildings
Skyscrapers in the London Borough of Tower Hamlets
Buildings and structures in the London Borough of Tower Hamlets
Office buildings completed in 2003
Skyscraper office buildings in London

Kohn Pedersen Fox buildings